Demetrius III may refer to:

 Demetrius III of Abkhazia, King of Abkhazia
 Demetrius III Aniketos, Indo-Greek king 
 Demetrius III Eucaerus (died 88 BC), Seleucid king
 Demetrius III of Georgia (–1453), King of Georgia